Cindy Alexander is an American indie singer-songwriter, and multi-instrumentalist. She currently resides in greater Los Angeles, California.

In 1998 Alexander was named Songwriter of the Year and nominated for Female Vocalist of the Year by the Los Angeles Music Awards, while her debut album See Red was nominated for Independent Pop Album of the Year. IN 2003 her 2nd album SMASH was nominated for Album of the Year by the same outfit.

In 2004, Alexander received several awards: Songwriter of the Year – JPF Music Awards, Best Female Rock Vocalist – All Access Music Awards, and Special Achievement Pop Artist – Los Angeles Music Awards.

Her next album Angels & Demons won Los Angeles Music Awards' Independent Pop Album of the Year in 2006 and was nominated also for Album of the Year.

In 2009 and 2010, she performed for the videogame White Knight Chronicles II soundtrack with the songs "Fly! -My Bluebrid-", "The Battlefield Flower" and "White Knight Chronicles 'Travelers'".

Her fourth album, Wobble with the World, was released in 2007 and was produced by her long-time collaborators Dave Darling and Paul Trudeau. The iTunes Store version of the album contains an extra bonus track "Slow Motion Miracle", proceeds of which go to a cancer support center charity www.wespark.org.

Her music has been featured in films Here on Earth, Smokers, Sugar & Spice, Dorm Daze II, and television shows Party of Five, Chasing Farrah).

Early life
Alexander was born Cynthia Ann Plotkin in Los Angeles, CA. Her mother, Nancy (née Kaufman), was an elementary school teacher, and her father, Gary Plotkin, was an attorney.

Winner of NBC's Star Tomorrow
NBC announced that it would air StarTomorrow in February 2006. Mottola severed his relationship with the show in June 2006, and producer David Foster was brought in. The prize was subsequently changed from a recording contract with Mottola's Casablanca Records to a contract with Foster's label.

Hosted by Michele Merkin, StarTomorrow premiered on NBC and NBC.com on July 31, 2006, when a one-hour show about the auditions aired on NBC. In a format similar to American Idol, 92 bands competed in weekly head-to-head competition, and bands that won were then given the chance to compete in the competition's second round.

The show finale was in November 2006 and was eventually won by award-winning artist, Cindy Alexander.
However, the show's contract was so bad that none of the Top 5 (Cindy Alexander, Bob Gentry, Brooke Ramel, Hydra FX, Blake Cody) bands signed.  NBC officially ceased production on March 26, 2007.

Judges
Travis Barker
Mick Fleetwood
David Foster
Billy Gibbons
Rob Tannenbaum

Breast Cancer Advocacy

Breastcancer.org
As a breast cancer survivor, Cindy became involved with Breastcancer.org as she used their resources many times herself during her journey from diagnosis to recovery. Her desire to give back to others led to her being named the Celebrity Ambassador for Breastcancer.org. In this role, she helps to spread the message about Breastcancer.org while she is performing on tour and at various public appearances.

The Kay Yow Cancer Fund

In 2017 Cindy toured extensively across the USA raising money for The Kay Yow Cancer Fund through raising funds through Play It Forward.
She had heard about former NC State Basketball Coach Kay Yow when she was asked to sing the National Anthem at a UCLA Women's Basketball Play4Kay game.
Kay was first diagnosed with breast cancer in 1987, and passed away on January 24, 2009, after facing her third bout with the disease. Before her death, she joined forces with the Women's Basketball Coaches Association (WBCA) and The V Foundation for Cancer Research to form the Kay Yow Cancer Fund, a 501 (c)(3) charitable organization committed to being a part of finding an answer in the fight against women's cancers through raising money for scientific research, assisting the underserved and unifying people for a common cause. Due to the unique partnership with The V Foundation, they use their Scientific Advisory Committee to ensure all donations support only the cancer research projects with the most potential to find a cure.

Dr. Kristi Funk, Author of "Breasts"
Alexander teamed up with Dr. Kristi Funk, author of "Breasts" for her book launch party at Amoeba Records in Hollywood, CA.

Discography
Source:

Albums 
 1999 – See Red (JamCat Records, nominated for Album of the Year by the L.A. Music Awards)
 2003 – SMASH (JamCat Records)
 2005 – Angels & Demons (Cindy Alexander (JamCat Records)
 2007 – Wobble with the World (JamCat Records)
 2012 – Every Rise And Fall (JamCat Records)
 2014 – Curve (Blue Élan Records)
 2014 – Christmas is Here (Blue Élan Records)
 2015 – An American Girl (Blue Élan Records)
 2016 – Deep Waters  (Blue Élan Records)
 2018 – Nowhere to Hide (Blue Élan Records)
 2021 – While the Angels Sigh  (Blue Élan Records)

Soundtracks 
 2001 – Sugar & Spice (Trauma Records/New Line Records)
 2010 – White Knight Chronicles 2 (Aniplex Inc.)

Compilations 
 2002 – Chilled Sirens (Water Music Records/Universal)
 2003 – Sunday Brunch (Treadstone Records/Columbia Records Japan)
 2005 – Back Home (Benefits Children International, see homecd.net)
 2006 – Eclectic Café (Water Music Records/Universal)

References

External links

 

American acoustic guitarists
American women guitarists
Living people
Year of birth missing (living people)
American women singer-songwriters
Singer-songwriters from California
Guitarists from Los Angeles
21st-century American women